Brodowski (feminine: Brodowska; plural: Brodowscy) is a Polish-language surname.

People 
Antoni Brodowski (1784–1832), Polish painter
Dick Brodowski (1932–2019), American baseball player
Fedor von Brodowski (1841–1923), German general
Fritz von Brodowski (1886–1944), German general
Józef Brodowski the Elder (c.1772–1853), Polish painter
Józef Brodowski the Younger (1828–1900), Polish painter, son of Antoni
Karsten Brodowski (born 1985), German rower

Polish-language surnames